Clionella liltvedi is a species of sea snail, a marine gastropod mollusk in the family Clavatulidae.

Description
The length of the shell attains 29 mm.

The elongated shell has a narrowly bucciniform shape. The spire whorls are convex, the body whorl oblong. The ground color of the shell is dark brown with paler brown between the cords on the base. . The axial ribs are slightly nodular by groups of widely spaced spiral ridges. These ribs are strong and rather straight, initially numbering about 10 per whorl and increasing to 17–20 on the penultimate whorl.

Distribution
This marine species occurs along Table Bay and west coast of Cape Peninsula, South Africa.

References

 Kilburn, R.N. (1985). Turridae (Mollusca: Gastropoda) of southern Africa and Mozambique. Part 2. Subfamily Clavatulinae. Ann. Natal Mus. 26(2), 17-470

Endemic fauna of South Africa
liltvedi
Gastropods described in 1985